Martin Gregory (born 10 February 1965 in Malta) was a professional footballer who is currently manager of Melita in the Maltese Premier League, during his career he played for Sliema Wanderers, where he played as a striker.

External links
 

Living people
1965 births
Maltese footballers
Malta international footballers
Sliema Wanderers F.C. players
Maltese football managers
Qormi F.C. managers
Association football forwards